Pavol Masaryk (born 11 February 1980) is a Slovak football striker who plays for FK Hodonín.

Career

Club
He has previously played for TJ Holíč, MFK Myjava and FC Spartak Trnava.
In the 2006-07 he was the third top-scorer of the Corgoň Liga.

In February 2011, he joined Polish club Cracovia and signed a half year contract. He was released from Cracovia on 16 June 2011.
In July 2011, he joined Slovak club MFK Ružomberok. On 27 January 2016 he signed a contract with MFK Skalica.

Honours
 Slovak Superliga (1):
 2009

References

External links
 
 
 Masaryk on the Slovan website 
 Masaryk at WikiPasy.pl 

1980 births
Living people
People from Skalica District
Sportspeople from the Trnava Region
Slovak footballers
Association football forwards
ŠK Slovan Bratislava players
FC Spartak Trnava players
AEL Limassol players
Expatriate footballers in Cyprus
Cypriot First Division players
Slovak Super Liga players
MKS Cracovia (football) players
Ekstraklasa players
Expatriate footballers in Poland
MFK Ružomberok players
FK Senica players
MFK Skalica players
Slovak expatriate footballers